The Gujin Tushu Jicheng, also known as the Imperial Encyclopaedia, is a vast encyclopedic work written in China during the reigns of the Qing dynasty emperors Kangxi and Yongzheng. It was begun in 1700 and completed in 1725. The work was headed and compiled mainly by scholar Chen Menglei. Later on Jiang Tingxi helped work on it as well.

It is also sometimes called the Qinding Gujin Tushu Jicheng.

The encyclopaedia contained 10,000 volumes. Sixty-four imprints were made of the first edition, known as the Wu-ying Hall edition. The encyclopaedia consisted of 6 series, 32 divisions, and 6,117 sections. It contained 800,000 pages and over 100 million Chinese characters, making it the largest leishu ever printed. Topics covered included natural phenomena, geography, history, literature and government. The work was printed in 1726 using copper movable type printing. It spanned around 10 thousand rolls. To illustrate the huge size of the Gujin Tushu Jicheng, it is estimated to have contained 3 to 4 times the amount of material in the Encyclopædia Britannica Eleventh Edition.

In 1908, the Guangxu Emperor of China presented a set of the encyclopaedia in 5,000 fascicles to the China Society of London, which has deposited it on loan to Cambridge University Library. Another one of the three extant copies of the encyclopedia outside of China is located at the C.V. Starr East Asian Library at Columbia University. A complete copy in Japan was destroyed in the 1923 Great Kantō earthquake.

One of Yongzheng's brothers patronised the project for a while, although Yongzheng contrived to give exclusive credit to his father Kangxi instead.

Compilation 

The Kangxi Emperor hired Chen Menglei of Fujian to compile the encyclopedia. From 1700 to 1705, Chen Menglei worked day and night, writing most of the book, including 10,000 volumes and around 160 million words. It was originally titled the Compendium or Tushu Huibian (图书汇编). By 1706 the book's first draft was completed, and the Kangxi emperor changed the title to Gujin Tushu Jicheng. When the Yongzheng emperor ascended the throne, he ordered Jiang Tingxi to help Chen Menglei finish the encyclopedia for publication by around 1725.

Outline
The 6 series are as follows.

 Heavens/Time/Calendrics (历象): Celestial objects, the seasons, calendar mathematics and astronomy, heavenly portents
 Earth/Geography (方舆): Mineralogy, political geography, list of rivers and mountains, other nations (Korea, Japan, India, Kingdom of Khotan, Ryukyu Kingdom)
 Man/Society (明论): Imperial attributes and annals, the imperial household, biographies of mandarins, kinship and relations, social intercourse, dictionary of surnames, human relations, biographies of women
 Nature (博物): Procivilities (crafts, divination, games, medicine), spirits and unearthly beings, fauna, flora (all life forms on Earth)
 Philosophy (理学): Classics of non-fiction, aspects of philosophy (numerology, filial piety, shame, etc.), forms of writing, philology and literary studies
 Economy (经济): education and imperial examination, maintenance of the civil service, food and commerce, etiquette and ceremony, music, the military system, the judicial system, styles of craft and architecture
The six series in total are subdivided into 32 subdivisions.

Note that a pre-modern sense is intended in both "society" (that is, high society) and "economy" (which could be called "society" today), and the other major divisions do not match precisely to English terms.

Gallery

Part 1: Heavens/Astronomy

Part 2: Geography 
Territories

Borders

Part 3: Society

Human Affairs 
Describes some anatomy of the human body

Imperial Harem

Imperial Perfection

Part 4: Nature

Plant Kingdom

Part 5: Philosophy

Canonical and other Literature section 
Mathematics

Education and Conduct

Study of Characters

Part 6: Economy

Military

Punishments and blessing

Food

See also 
 Yongle Encyclopedia
 Siku Quanshu
 Hua Sui

References

Citations

Sources 

 Search for Modern China, Jonathan Spence, 1990.

External links

 故宮東吳數位古今圖書集成 etext
 WorldCat
 Archive.org
 HathiTrust
 An Alphabetical Index To The Chinese Encyclopaedia
 WorldCat
 Google Books
  
 
 Library of Congress

Chinese culture
Chinese encyclopedias
Qing dynasty literature
Sinology
Chinese literature
1725 books
1726 books
18th-century encyclopedias
Leishu